Colonial house may refer to:

American colonial architecture
Colonial House (TV series)
Colonial House (Salt Lake City, Utah) (also called McIntyre House), listed on the NRHP
Spanish Colonial architecture